Antoñita is a given name and a nickname. Notable people with this name include the following.

Given name
Antoñita Colomé (1912 – 2005), Spanish film actress
Antonita Maria Carmen Fernandez Moynihan, birthname of Maritoni Fernandez (born 1969), Filipina character actress and model
Antoñita Singla (born 1948), Spanish flamenco dancer and actress

Nickname
Antoñita, family nickname for Beatified María Antonia Bandrés Elósegui (1898 – 1919), Spanish Roman Catholic

Fictional characters
Antoñita la Fantástica, Borita Casas character
Antoñita "Lupe" Sino the name of the Penélope Cruz character inspired by Spanish actress Lupe Sino (born Antonia Bronchalo Lopesino) in Manolete

See also

Antonia (name)
Antonida Asonova
Antonieta (given name)
Antonija
Antonina (name)
Antoñito (name)
Antoniya

Spanish-language hypocorisms